The men's 1500 metres in speed skating at the 1980 Winter Olympics took place on 21 February, at the James B. Sheffield Olympic Skating Rink.

Records
Prior to this competition, the existing world and Olympic records were as follows:

The following new Olympic record was set.

Results

References

Men's speed skating at the 1980 Winter Olympics